Miroslav Jíška (born 4 October 1933) is a Czech rower who represented Czechoslovakia. He competed at the 1960 Summer Olympics in Rome with the men's coxless four where they came fourth.

References

1933 births
Living people
Czechoslovak male rowers
Olympic rowers of Czechoslovakia
Rowers at the 1960 Summer Olympics
People from Litoměřice
European Rowing Championships medalists
Sportspeople from the Ústí nad Labem Region